Australian Independent Radio (AIR) News is an Australia-wide radio news reporting service that delivers news bulletins as "ready to air" items. The main stories of the day from a national and international perspective are covered and, where possible, updated throughout each day with fresh actuality and clips constantly added.

As well as news and sport, AIR News delivers other services including a headlines service during breakfast and drive, AIR Sports Australia, a standalone sports package AIR SPORT AUSTRALIA twice daily (Monday to Friday)  and a 10-minute daily international news magazine "The World"—in collaboration with Feature Story News (FSN).
The News service now also delivers a State or Territory News for every State or Territory in Australia every morning Monday to Friday in time for breakfast and an additional lunch and afternoon bulletin for WA (Western Australia).

The Organisation

AIR News was started by JA Online Services, a sole trader partnership of Arthur & Jacqui Stevens based in Melbourne at the end of 2004.
As of the beginning of the new financial year 2011-12 (1 July 2011) the business was transferred to the operation of AIR News Pty Ltd, a private company with head office based in St Kilda Rd, Melbourne with a main studio in suburban Syndal (Glen Waverley). In mid-2012 the studio was relocated to bayside Aspendale.
Then in 2019, the AIR News business was onsold to Terry Daniel (Air News Media) in Coffs Harbour.
The transition took place on 1 July 2019.

Programs

Presenters / Reporters

Stations serviced

Australian Capital Territory
90.3 Artsound FM (Tuggeranong)
92.7 Artsound FM (Canberra)

New South Wales
87.6 Classic hits (Knights Hill)
87.6 Magic 876 (Mudgee)
87.6 Riot FM (Tomaree Peninsula)
87.6 Noise FM Pty Ltd (Trading as River FM 87.6)
87.6 Sky Sports Radio (Barradine) - weekends
87.6 Sky Sports Radio (Bega) - weekends
87.6 Sky Sports Radio (Bellingen) - weekends
87.6 Sky Sports Radio (Berrigan) - weekends
87.6 Sky Sports Radio (Binnaway) - weekends
87.6 Sky Sports Radio (Braidwood) - weekends
87.6 Sky Sports Radio (Byron Bay) - weekends
87.6 Sky Sports Radio (Casino) - weekends
87.6 Sky Sports Radio (Coolah) - weekends
87.6 Sky Sports Radio (Coonamble) - weekends
87.6 Sky Sports Radio (Dunedoo) - weekends
87.6 Sky Sports Radio (Finley) - weekends
87.6 Sky Sports Radio (Foster) - weekends
87.6 Sky Sports Radio (Gilgandra) - weekends
87.6 Sky Sports Radio (Grenfell) - weekends
87.6 Sky Sports Radio (Griffith) - weekends
87.6 Sky Sports Radio (Gundagai) - weekends
87.6 Sky Sports Radio (Hillston) - weekends
87.6 Sky Sports Radio (Jerilderie) - weekends
87.6 Sky Sports Radio (Leeton) - weekends
87.6 Sky Sports Radio (Lennox Head) - weekends
87.6 Sky Sports Radio (Lismore) - weekends
87.6 Sky Sports Radio (Mullumbimby) - weekends
87.6 Sky Sports Radio (Narromine) - weekends
87.6 Sky Sports Radio (Temora) - weekends
87.6 Sky Sports Radio (Tenterfield) - weekends
87.6 Sky Sports Radio (Ulladulla) - weekends
87.6 Sky Sports Radio (Warren) - weekends
87.6 Sky Sports Radio (Wentworth) - weekends
87.6 Sky Sports Radio (West Wyalong) - weekends
87.8 The Beat (Penrith)
87.8 Classic hits (New Lambton)
87.8 Myall Coast Radio (Tea Gardens)
87.8 GT-FM Gulmarrad (Maclean)
87.9 Ten FM (Tenterfield)
88.0 Classic hits (Bowral)
88.0 Bay FM (Nelson Bay)
88.0 Classic hits (Taree)
88.0 Sky Sports Radio (Ballina) - weekends
88.0 Sky Sports Radio (Deniliquin) - weekends
88.0 Sky Sports Radio (Dorrigo) - weekends
88.0 Sky Sports Radio (Evans Head) - weekends
88.0 Sky Sports Radio (Gulgong) - weekends
88.0 Sky Sports Radio (Kyogle) - weekends
88.0 Sky Sports Radio (Maclean) - weekends
88.0 Sky Sports Radio (Nambuccah Heads) - weekends
88.0 Sky Sports Radio (Narrandera) - weekends
88.0 Sky Sports Radio (Rylstone) - weekends
88.0 Sky Sports Radio (Tocumwal) - weekends
88.0 Sky Sports Radio (Woolgoolga) - weekends
88.0 Sky Sports Radio (Yamba) - weekends
88.0 Vintage FM (Penrith)
88.7 Vintage FM (Camden, Picton) - Headlines
88.9 DCFM (Dubbo)
88.9 Braidwood FM (Braidwood)
89.5 Silo FM (Peak Hill)
89.7 Sky Sports Radio (Lithgow) - weekends
89.9 Harmony FM ( Richmond) - Wednesday
89.9 Hawksbury Gold  - selected days
90.3 Sky Sports Radio (Dubbo) - weekends
90.5 Sky Sports Radio (Tamworth) - weekends
90.9 Sky Sports Radio (Walcha) - weekends
91.1 Spirit FM (Narrandera)
91.9 STA FM (Inverell)
92.1 Sky Sports Radio (Condoblin) - weekends
92.1 2Hay FM (Hay)
92.3 Triple U (Nth Shoalhaven)
92.5 Sky Sports Radio (Culcairn) - weekends
92.5 Sky Sports Radio (Mulwala) - weekends
92.7 Sky Sports Radio (Inverell) - weekends
92.7 Sky Sports Radio (Pt Macquarie) - weekends
93.3  Radio Five-0-Plus - (Gosford)
94.3 Sounds of The Mountains (Gundagai)
94.9 Sky Sports Radio (Barham) - weekends
94.9 Sky Sports Radio (Corowa) - weekends
95.5 Sky Sports Radio (Wagga Wagga) - weekends
95.9 Sky Sports Radio (Gunnedah) - weekends
96.1 Sky Sports Radio (Bourke) - weekends
96.1 Sky Sports Radio (Brewarrina) - weekends
96.3 Sky Sports Radio (Batemans Bay) - weekends
96.3 Sounds of The Mountains (Tumut)
96.5 2CHR FM (Cessnock)
96.7 2GHR FM (Holbrook)
96.9 Sky Sports Radio (Cooma) - weekends
97.1 Sky Sports Radio (Balranald) - weekends
97.1 Sky Sports Radio (Collaranebri) - weekends
97.1 Sky Sports Radio (Junee) - weekends
97.3 Lake Macquarie FM (Lake Macquarie)
98.3 Sky Sports Radio (Wilcannia) - weekends
98.5 Sky Sports Radio (Lightning Ridge) - weekends
98.5 Sky Sports Radio (Moruya) - weekends
98.5 Sky Sports Radio (Murrurundi) - weekends
99.0 Sky Sports Radio (Nyngan) - weekends
99.3 Sky Sports Radio (Albury) - weekends
99.3 Sky Sports Radio (Gloucester) - weekends
99.3 Sky Sports Radio (Holbrook) - weekends
99.7 Triple U (South Shoalhaven)
100.3 YASS FM (Yass)
100.3 2MCR FM (Campbelltown)
100.5 Sky Sports Radio (Broken Hill) - weekends
100.9 Sky Sports Radio (Bathurst) - weekends
100.9 Port Stephens FM (Port Stephens)
101.5 Sky Sports Radio (Grafton) - weekends
101.5 Sky Sports Radio (Kempsey) - weekends
101.9 Paradise FM Ballina
102.5 TEM FM (Temora)
102.7 Sky Sports Radio (Jindabyne) - weekends
103.3 2GCR FM (Goulburn)
103.3 Sky Sports Radio (Muswellbrook) - weekends
103.7 Sky Sports Radio (Moree) - weekends
103.7 Sky Sports Radio (Nowra) - weekends
103.9 2WAY FM (Wauchope)
104.1 CHY FM (Coffs Harbour)
104.3 Sky Sports Radio (Armidale) - weekends
104.5 Sky Sports Radio (Bombala) - weekends
104.5 Triple U (Nowra)
105.7 Sky Sports Radio (Taree) - weekends
105.9 2NVR – Nambucca Valley Radio
106.7 Sky Sports Radio (Orange) - weekends
106.9 Vox FM (Illawarra)
106.9 Sky Sports Radio (Narooma) - weekends
106.9 Sky Sports Radio (Thredbo) - weekends
107.1 2AAA FM (Wagga Wagga)
107.1 Sky Sports Radio (Coffs Harbour) - weekends
107.1 Sky Sports Radio (Eden) - weekends
107.3 2REM FM (Albury)
107.5 Sky Sports Radio (Glen Innes) - weekends
107.7 Radio Upper Murray (Tumbarumba)
107.9 Radio Dungog (Dungog)
107.9 Sky Sports Radio (Yass) - weekends
1017 AM Sky Sports Radio (Sydney) - weekends
1314 AM Sky Sports Radio (Wollongong) - weekends
1341 AM Sky Sports Radio (Newcastle) - weekends
1593 AM Sky Sports Radio (Murwillumbah) - weekends
1611 AM Station X (Wee Waa)
1629 AM Unforgettable (Newcastle)
2NVR - Nambucca Valley

ONLINE
Heart FM ( Kooringal)
M1 Pacific Motorway Traffic
Moodfood Radio ( Merewether)
New2UW (Newcastle)
Newy 87.8 FM Newcastle
radio.sydney (Sydney) - Headlines only
Shack Radio
The Beat -(Penrith)
Radio319.Rock (Cardiff)
Loving Life FM 103.1 Clarence Valley Christian Broadcasters
Central Coast Radio
Ozzy Stream Radio (Coolac)
Pulse FM Radio online (Richmond)
Sydney Classic Hits
Starter FM (Kellyville)
Hawkesbury Radio
my88 (Belrose)
On The Road Radio ( Evans Head)

NSW News only
87.8 Radio WOW (Narrabri)
88.0 Radio WOW (Wee Waa)

Northern Territory
90.1 Katherine Community Radio (Tindal)
95.9 RadioTAB (Alice Springs)
97.3 RadioTAB (Yulara)
101.3 Katherine Community Radio (Katherine)
103.7 RadioTAB (Alyangula)
103.7 RadioTAB (Jabiru)
103.7 RadioTAB (Katherine)
103.7 RadioTAB (Nhulunbuy)
103.7 RadioTAB (Pine Creek)
103.7 RadioTAB (Tennant Creek)
106.9 Gove FM ((Nhulunbuy))
1242AM RadioTAB (Darwin)

Northern Territory News only
97.7 97Seven (Darwin)
106.9 Gove FM (Nhulunbuy)

Queensland
87.6 RadioTAB (Airlie Beach)
87.6 RadioTAB (Atherton)
87.6 RadioTAB (Biloela)
87.6 RadioTAB (Cunnamulla)
87.6 RadioTAB (Hughenden)
87.6 RadioTAB (Julia Creek)
87.6 RadioTAB (Mareeba)
87.6 RadioTAB (Tambo)
87.6 RadioTAB (Yeppoon)
88.0 RadioTAB (Aramac)
88.0 RadioTAB (Augathella)
88.0 Bribie's (Bribie Island)
88.0 RadioTAB (Moranbah)
88.0 RadioTAB (Quilpie)
88.0 RadioTAB (Richmond)
89.3 Rose City FM (Warwick)
89.7 RadioTAB (Beaudesert)
90.3 RadioTAB (Goondiwindi)
90.7 Crow FM (Kingaroy)
91.5 FM (Gympie)
91.9 Fresh FM (Gladstone)
92.9 Voice FM (Toowoomba)
93.1 RadioTAB (Kingaroy)
93.1 RadioTAB (Stanthorpe)
93.9 RadioTAB (Tully)
94.1 FM (Gold Coast)
94.3 RadioTAB (Dalby)
94.3 RadioTAB (Gladstone)
94.3 RadioTAB (Roma)
95.1 RadioTAB (Warwick)
95.5 RadioTAB (Bundaberg)
95.5 RadioTAB (Emerald)
95.9 Classic hits (Roma)
96.5 Family Radio (Brisbane) - weekends
96.9 4RFM (Moranbah)
97.1 Sweet FM (Ayr/Home Hill)
97.3 RadioTAB (Innisfail)
97.5 RadioTAB (Blackwater)
98.3 RadioTAB (Blackall)
98.3 RadioTAB (Winton)
98.5 FM Capricorn Community Radio 4YOU (Rockhampton)
98.7 TEN FM (Stanthorpe) 
99.1 RadioTAB (Charters Towers)
99.9 RadioTAB (Rockhampton)
100.1 Rim FM (Boonah)
100.3 Bay FM (Brisbane)
101.1 101FM Logan (Logan)
101.3 RadioTAB (Bedourie)
101.3 RadioTAB (Birdsville)
101.5 Beau FM (Beaudesert)
103.3 RadioTAB (Barcaldine)
103.3 RadioTAB (Cooktown)
103.3 RadioTAB (Mt Isa)
103.3 RadioTAB (Normanton)
103.3 RadioTAB (Weipa)
103.5 RadioTAB (Mackay)
103.7 RadioTAB (Cloncurry)
103.7 RadioTAB (Collinsville)
103.7 RadioTAB (Longreach)
103.7 RadioTAB (St George)
103.7 RadioTAB (Thursday Island)
103.9 Triple T (Townsville)
104.1 RadioTAB (Charleville)
104.3 RadioTAB (Cairns)
105.9 My105FM (Mackay & Whitsundays)
106.1 RadioTAB (Clermont)
106.5 Salt FM (Buderim) - weekends
107.5 4CRM FM (Mackay)
107.5 Fraser Coast FM (Pialba)
891AM RadioTAB (Townsville)
1008AM RadioTAB (Brisbane)
1161AM RadioTAB (Hervey Bay)
1161AM RadioTAB (Maryborough)
1197AM Switch Brisbane (Brisbane)
GT-FM 87.8 Gulmarrad

ONLINE
Liquid Radio - http://www.liquidradio.online
Radio Springfield City 
Totally Radio (Camp Hill)

South Australia
87.6 Alex FM (Goolwa)
87.6 RadioTAB (Millicent)
87.6 RadioTAB (Port Augusta)
88.0 RadioTAB (Mount Gambier)
88.0 RadioTAB (Naracoorte)
88.0 RadioTAB (Penola)
88.0 RadioTAB (Port Lincoln)
88.0 RadioTAB (Port Pirie)
88.0 RadioTAB (Victor Harbor)
88.0 RadioTAB (Whyalla)
89.7 5TCB (Naracoorte)
98.5 5TCB (Padthaway)
95.5 RadioTAB (Roxby Downs)
98.1 RadioTAB (Coober Pedy)
100.1 5GTR FM (Mt Gambier)
100.7 Riverland Life FM (Loxton)
102.1 RadioTAB (Ceduna)
104.5 5TCB (Keith)
105.1 Trax FM (Port Pirie)
105.5 Rox FM (Roxby Downs)
106.5 5TCB (Bordertown)
107.5 3MBR FM (Lameroo)
107.7 Triple Y (Whyalla)
1539AM RadioTAB (Adelaide)
Blade Networks (Unley)

South Australia State News only
90.7 KIX FM (Kangaroo Island)

Tasmania
87.6 RadioTAB (Bicheno)
87.6 RadioTAB (Queenstown)
87.6 RadioTAB (Rosebery)
87.6 RadioTAB (Scottsdale)
87.6 RadioTAB (Smithton)
87.6 RadioTAB (St Helens/St Marys)
87.6 RadioTAB (Strahan)
87.6 Pulse FM Kingborough and Huon (Geeveston)
87.8 Pulse FM Kingborough and Huon (Kingborough and Huonville)
88.9 Coast FM (Smithton)
93.7 Star FM (St Helens)
96.1 7RPH (Devonport)
96.1 Hobart FM (Hobart)
97.7 RadioTAB (Burnie)
98.5 Star FM (Bicheno)
100.3 Star FM (St Marys)
101.3 RadioTAB (Devonport)
104.7 Coast FM (Devonport)
105.3 Way FM (Riverside / Launceston)
106.1 Coast FM (Wynyard/Burnie/Ulverstone)
106.9 7RPH (Launceston)
864 AM 7RPH (Hobart)
1008AM RadioTAB (Launceston)
1080AM RadioTAB (Hobart)

Tasmania State News only
99.3 Edge Radio (Hobart)
96.9 MVFM

Victoria
88.1 3MFM (South Gippsland)
88.6 Plenty Valley FM (Mill Park) 
88.7 Radio Upper Murray (Walwa)
88.9 UGFM (Yea)
89.1 3MFM (Phillip Island)
89.5 3MFM (Foster)
92.9 3MBR FM (Ouyen)
94.1 3WBC (Box Hill)
94.5 UGFM (Kinglake)
94.7 Pulse FM (Geelong)
97.7 Casey Radio (Cranbourne)
98.5 UGFM (Marysville/Lake Mountain)
98.9 Corryong (Radio Upper Murray)
98.9 UGFM (Flowerdale)
99.1 Goldfields FM (Maryborough)
99.1 Yarra Valley Community Radio (Woori Yallock)
99.3 Classic hits (Seymour)
99.3 Sunbury Radio (Sunbury)
99.7 Radio Mansfield
99.9 Voice FM (Ballarat)
103.5 3MBR FM (Murrayville)
103.9 Seymour FM (Seymour)
104.7 EMFM (Echuca/Moama)
106.9 UGFM (Alexandra)
Online

 Aussies Bar Radio  
Phaze FM (Bakery Hill)
The Buzzz – Melbourne VIC
Australian Truck Radio

Western Australia
91.3 Sport FM (Western Sports Media)
92.9 6NEW FM (Newman)
97.1 2Oceans FM (Augusta)
100.5 Radio Mama (Geraldton)
101.3 Hedland Community Radio (Port Hedland)
102.9 Radio Mama (Carnarvon)
103.7 Bunbury Community Radio (Bunbury)
103.9 Hope FM (Esperance)
1611 AM Gold MX (Albany)

Western Australia State News only
97.9 6DBY FM (Derby)
98.1 6PRK FM (Halls Creek)
101.3 York FM (York)
105.3 Toodyay Community Radio (Toodyay)

Online
WA Radio Network
Youth Jam Radio

ONLINE ONLY
 Radio 2DD - www.facebook.com/radio2DD (on the myTuner Radio App)
 Shack Radio - www.shackradio.com

AIR Sport Australia only
96.5 KLFM (Bendigo)
106.3 KLFM (Castlemaine)

Australia / Overseas

 Radio Appna Digital Australia and Fiji - Hindi Service
 SDA - Seventh Day Adventist Church - 192 LPONS (Narrowcasting) - Breakfast news.

Program Distribution Service

IF THAT AIN'T COUNTRY - Hosted by Western Red.

MELOMANIA – Produced by 5TCB FM Bordertown Official website

MATTY'S HOT 30 COUNTDOWN This is a current music program. Official website

ESSENTIAL 80'S - Produced by Livermore Media

External links
 AIR NEWS WEBSITE Official website

Australian radio programs